Zinnia bicolor is a species of Zinnia from Mexico.

References

External links
 
 
 iNaturalist observations and images of Zinnia bicolor

Flora of Mexico
bicolor